The Pine Street Neighborhood Historic District encompasses a neighborhood of Cambridge, Maryland with more than 150 years of history as an African-American neighborhood. It is a predominantly residential area with some commercial development. The majority of the district's housing consists of somewhat uniform factory worker housing. There are rows of two-story, two-bay, gable-front frame houses, sometimes with four-bay duplexes.

The district was listed on the National Register of Historic Places in 2012.

See also
National Register of Historic Places listings in Dorchester County, Maryland

References

External links
Map of Historic District

Further reading

External links

African-American history in Cambridge, Maryland
Historic districts in Dorchester County, Maryland
Historic districts on the National Register of Historic Places in Maryland
National Register of Historic Places in Dorchester County, Maryland